The Toledo Correctional Institution (ToCI) is a state prison for men located in Toledo, Lucas County, Ohio, owned and operated by the Ohio Department of Rehabilitation and Correction.

The facility was opened in 2000, and houses approximately 750 maximum security inmates. The Toledo Correctional Institution houses Protective Custody inmates Level 3 and above, Level 4 offenders, and ERH1, ERH2, and ERH 3 level inmates. ERH is the highest security levels in Ohio.

Notable inmates

Donald Harvey - Serial killer.  Died during incarceration.
John Parsons - Murdering a police officer. Was on the FBI Ten Most Wanted Fugitives list in 2006 for escaping from the Ross County Jail. Serving a life sentence.

References

Prisons in Ohio
Buildings and structures in Lucas County, Ohio
2000 establishments in Ohio